Martin H. Redish is the Louis and Harriet Ancel Professor of Law and Public Policy at the Northwestern University Pritzker School of Law. Redish has written 19 books and over a hundred law review articles in the areas of civil procedure and constitutional law, among others. He is among the most frequently cited American legal scholars.

Legal theories

First Amendment
Redish supports an "autonomy theory" of free speech, taking the view that the First Amendment protects speech in order to advance individuals' interest in the self-realization that they obtain by being able to speak without government interference. According to Redish, all of the other values attached to free speech, such as the advancement of liberal democracy, necessarily depend on the concept of individual self-realization. This view contrasts with that of scholars such as Alexander Meiklejohn, who advocate a theory of the First Amendment based on the importance of democratic self-governance, and of scholars who subscribe to the theory that the First Amendment exists to promote the marketplace of ideas.

Career
Redish has spent his entire academic career at Northwestern University, where he has been a faculty member since 1973. Before entering academia, he briefly practiced law in New York. Redish received a bachelor's degree in political science from the University of Pennsylvania and a Juris Doctor degree from Harvard Law School.

Selected publications

Books
Richard Marcus, Martin Redish, Edward F. Sherman, & James Pfander, Civil Procedure: A Modern Approach (6th ed. 2013)
Moore's Federal Practice 3d ed., volume 15
Martin H. Redish, Wholesale Justice: Constitutional Democracy and the Problem of the Class Action Lawsuit (2009)

Articles
Martin H. Redish, The Value of Free Speech, 130 U. Pa. L. Rev. 591 (1982)
Martin H. Redish, Advocacy of Unlawful Conduct and the First Amendment: In Defense of Clear and Present Danger, 70 Cal. L. Rev. 1159 (1982).
Martin H. Redish, Electronic Discovery and the Litigation Matrix, 51 Duke L.J. 561 (2001)

References

American lawyers
American legal scholars
Harvard Law School alumni
University of Pennsylvania alumni
American scholars of constitutional law
Living people
Northwestern University Pritzker School of Law faculty
Year of birth missing (living people)